C. tigris may refer to:
 Calliostoma tigris, a snail species endemic to New Zealand
 Calumma tigris, a chameleon species
 Cnemidophorus tigris, a lizard species
 Crotalus tigris, a pitviper species
 Cypraea tigris, a cowry species

See also
 Tigris (disambiguation)